Henry Sanders may refer to:

 Henry Sanders (historian) (1727–1785), English antiquarian
 Henry Sanders (politician) (born 1942), Democratic member of the Alabama Senate
 Henry G. Sanders (born 1942), American actor
 Henry Russell Sanders (1905–1958), American college football player and coach
 Henry Sanders (priest) (1807–1888), Church of England priest
 Henry Armytage Sanders (1886–1936), New Zealand war photographer and cinematographer

See also
 Henry Frederick Conrad Sander (1847–1920), orchidologist and nurseryman
 Henry Saunders (disambiguation)